The 2014 USA Sevens was the second tournament within the 2013-14 Sevens World Series. It was held over the weekend of 15–16 February 2014 at Fifth Third Bank Stadium in the Atlanta suburb of Kennesaw, Georgia.

Format
The teams were drawn into three pools of four teams each. Each team played everyone in their pool one time. The top two teams from each pool advanced to the Cup/Plate brackets while the top 2 third place teams will also compete in the Cup/Plate. The rest of the teams from each group went to the Bowl brackets.

Teams
The participating teams and schedule were announced on 15 January 2014.

Pool Stage

Pool A

Pool B

Pool C

Knockout stage

Bowl

Plate

Cup

References

External links
Official website

2014
2013–14 IRB Women's Sevens World Series
2014 in women's rugby union
2014 in American rugby union
rugby union
2014 rugby sevens competitions
2014 in sports in Georgia (U.S. state)
February 2014 sports events in the United States